The Oregon Zoo, originally the Portland Zoo and later the Washington Park Zoo, is a zoo located in Washington Park, Portland, Oregon, approximately  southwest of downtown Portland. Founded in 1888, it is the oldest zoo west of the Mississippi River.

The  zoo is owned by the regional Metro government. It currently holds more than 1,800 animals of more than 230 species, including 19 endangered species and 9 threatened species. The zoo also boasts an extensive plant collection throughout its animal exhibits and specialized gardens. The zoo also operates and maintains the  narrow gauge Washington Park & Zoo Railway that previously connected to the International Rose Test Garden inside the park, but currently runs only within the zoo.

The Oregon Zoo is Oregon's largest paid and arguably most popular visitor attraction, with more than 1.6 million visitors in 2016. The zoo is a member of the Association of Zoos and Aquariums, and the World Association of Zoos and Aquariums.

History
The Oregon Zoo was founded in 1888, making it the oldest North American zoo west of the Mississippi. It all began with two bears purchased by Richard Knight – one brown bear and one grizzly. A former seaman turned pharmacist, Knight began collecting animals from his seafaring friends. He kept his collection in the back of his drug store on Third & Morrison streets. When caring for the animals became too large a responsibility he sought to sell them to the city of Portland.  Instead of buying the animals, the city offered to give Knight two circus cages and allowed him to place the caged bears on the grounds of City Park (now called Washington Park).

Care and feeding of the bears, however, still fell to the Knight family and friends. It was not long before Knight addressed the city council again regarding the bears. Just five months later, he offered to donate the bears, along with their cages, to the city. Portland City Council accepted his offer on November 7, 1888, and thus began the Portland Zoo. Located in Washington Park, it was sometimes referred to as the Washington Park Zoo.

By 1894, there were over 300 animals in the zoo’s collection. In 1925, the zoo moved to the site of the present Portland Japanese Garden, still within Washington Park.

The zoo moved again in 1958–59 to its current site, designed by Lawrence, Tucker & Wallmann. This was located in Hoyt Park, west of Washington Park, but some years later the two parks were combined as Washington Park. At this time, the Portland Zoo Railway was constructed to connect the zoo to its former site in Washington Park and other attractions there. The zoo's move to the new, much larger site was made in stages, over more than a year, with the first animals being moved in spring 1958 and limited public access being opened in June 1958, one day after the first section of the Zoo Railway opened.  During the transition period the new zoo was only open on weekends, as most animals were still at the old site awaiting completion of their new enclosures.  However, the new railway operated six days a week until mid-September. Meanwhile, the old zoo remained in operation, but in May 1959 was restricted to pedestrian access only, closed to automobile access, for its last months of operation.

The zoo at its current site opened on July 3, 1959.  It was renamed the Portland Zoological Gardens at that time, but remained commonly known as the Portland Zoo. The elephants and big cats were not moved to the new zoo until November.  A new interchange was constructed on the adjacent freeway, the Sunset Highway, for better access to the new zoo.

The zoo became popular locally in 1953, when Rosy the Asian elephant was acquired. The zoo became world-famous in 1962 when the Asian elephant "Packy" was born.  He was the first elephant born in the Western Hemisphere in 44 years and was (as of 2010) the tallest Asian elephant in the United States at 10.5 ft (3.2 m) tall. A total of 28 more calves have been born at the Oregon Zoo, including seven sired by Packy (two of which, Shine and Rama, remained at the zoo), making it the most successful zoo elephant breeding program in the world.  On August 23, 2008, Rose-Tu, the granddaughter of the zoo's first elephant Rosy, gave birth to a son named Samudra. The birth made Samudra the first third-generation captive-born elephant in North America.

Attendance in 1962, the year in which Packy was born, was 1.2 million people. Over the next several years, the number of animals declined, from 450 (representing 150 species) in 1962 to 386 (representing 123 species) in 1976, and annual attendance also declining over the same period, reaching its lowest point in 1975, with 448,198 visitors.

Until 1971, the zoo was operated by the City, and then by the Portland Zoological Society under contract to the City. In 1976, area voters approved a tax levy plan under which the zoo was taken over by the Metropolitan Service District (or MSD, now known as Metro). Ownership of the zoo passed to Metro on July 1, 1976. Metro has continued expansion projects, aided by donors, sponsors and volunteers.

Later in 1976, MSD renamed the zoo the Washington Park Zoo after a naming contest. The railway was renamed the Washington Park and Zoo Railway two years later.

The decline in attendance seen in the 1960s and 1970s eventually began to reverse, and the zoo recorded 752,632 visitors in 1984 and 897,189 in 1986.

The Metro Council changed the zoo's name from the Washington Park Zoo to the Oregon Zoo in April 1998. In September of that year, the zoo became accessible by the region's MAX light rail system, with the opening of a Westside MAX line featuring an underground Washington Park station. In 2003, the zoo began participation in a California condor recovery program started by San Diego Wild Animal Park and Los Angeles Zoo. The program is designed to breed California condors to be released into the wild and save them from extinction.

In November 2008, regional voters approved a $125 million bond measure to improve infrastructure, enhance older exhibits and increase access to conservation education and the degree of sustainability. Attendance at the zoo reached a record 1.6 million visitors for their 2008 to 2009 year. The record was due in part to the birth of another baby elephant. A new record was set the following year with 1,612,359 people visiting the zoo. The zoo again brought in more than 1.6 million visitors in 2016.

On February 9, 2017, Oregon Zoo staff decided to euthanize Packy after a long struggle with drug-resistant tuberculosis. He was laid to rest at an unidentified city-owned "wooded, grassy area" that is not open to the public. At the time of his death, Packy was 54 years old.

Exhibits

Africa Rainforest 
In addition to animals, the exhibit includes artwork and the Congo Ranger Station, a mock up of a safari expedition. Animals in the exhibit include Rodrigues fruit bats, straw-colored fruit bats, spotted-necked otters, West African slender-snouted crocodiles and crested porcupines. The rainforest includes three main areas: the Bamba Du Jon Swamp, which houses West African lungfish, African bullfrogs and reptiles; the rainforest aviary, which houses lesser flamingos, hadada ibises and white-faced whistling ducks and the main rainforest area.

Africa Savanna
This exhibit includes animals typical of East Africa and includes an aviary and areas for large mammals. These include eastern black rhinos, bontebok, Speke's gazelle, naked mole-rats, red-tailed monkeys, Masai and reticulated giraffe, and African spurred tortoises. The zoo kept a plains zebra named Citation until her death in 2013. The zoo had also kept a pair of hippos named Poppy & Bubbles until March 2018, when they were moved to the Fort Worth Zoo so the zoo could expand their rhinoceros habitat.

Predators of the Serengeti, a $6.8 million exhibit which opened in September 2009, expanded the Africa Savanna  into the site of the former Alaska Tundra exhibit which used to house: Muskoxen and Grizzly Bears. Animals in the exhibit include African predators like lions, cheetahs and African wild dogs, along with other animals nearby such as common dwarf mongooses, ring-tailed lemurs, northern red-billed hornbills and a Central African rock python. The zoo previously had lions, but closed the exhibit in 1998 to build Steller Cove. The three new lions come from zoos in California, Virginia and Wisconsin. On September 4, 2013, it was announced that five-year-old Neka, one of the zoo's two female lions, was pregnant and would likely soon give birth, it then happened in late 2013, as she gave birth to three cubs, named Kamali, Zalika and Angalia respectively. In August 2014, it was announced that the other lioness, Kya, was due herself. On September 8, 2014, Kya gave birth to a litter of four lion cubs. Three days later, however, one of the cubs had to be humanely euthanized due to an untreatable leg injury.

Discovery Plaza 

Built in the remaining portion of the 1959 feline building (the rest was demolished to make way for Steller Cove), the Amur Cats exhibit is planted to evoke a northern Asian forest. The Discovery plaza exhibit now houses red pandas and Amur tigers.

The exhibit formerly contained a pair of Amur leopards with a 19 year old male named Boris being one of the oldest Amur leopards in captivity. Boris was euthanized on October 10, 2018

Elephant Lands

Three female (Sung-Surin "Shine", Rose-Tu, and Chendra; Lily died on November 29, 2018) and two male (Samudra and Samson) Asian elephants are displayed at the popular elephant exhibit. All were born at the zoo, with the exception of Chendra, who was orphaned in the wild; and Samson, who was acquired from the Albuquerque Zoo. Chendra is the first Borneo elephant in the United States. On November 30, 2012, at 2:17 a.m., Rose-Tu and the late Tusko (who are also the parents of Samudra) had a female calf Lily, weighing about 300 lbs (136 kg) at birth. There is a swimming hole in which up to ten elephants can simultaneously completely submerge, sandy ground for comfortable walking and a scratching station, which the elephants often choose to scratch their head, sides, belly, etc. Construction for the expansion began in 2013, and included a variety of terrain (meadows, forests, and mud wallows with sand lining the whole enclosure), a timed-feeding system to provide more natural stimulation, and an eco-friendly heating system to keep them warm year-round. Areas of the exhibit such as the Encounter Habitat were completed in summer of 2014, and their new habitat was finished in autumn of 2015.

Great Northwest
This exhibit includes wildlife from the western portions of the Pacific Northwest, and has eight areas: Black Bear Ridge, Eagle Canyon, Cascade Stream and Pond, Cougar Crossing, Cascade Crest, Trillium Creek Family Farm, and Steller Cove. Cascade Canyon Trail connects each of the exhibits, except Steller Cove, and includes a suspension bridge that offers views of Black Bear Ridge.

Opened in 1998, Cascade Crest is a mountain-like exhibit made mostly of basalt and features a snow cave, cirque lake, and twisted alpine trees. The  exhibit cost $11.6 million and is located near the entrance to the zoo. The only animals are mountain goats.

Black Bear Ridge is the next exhibit along the Cascade Canyon Trail. The $2 million area opened in 2007 and is home to American black bears Black Bear Ridge has four black bears (three males and one female) added in April 2010 after the previous three had been euthanized for health reasons. Their names are Tuff, Dale, Cubby, and Takota.

Eagle Canyon is the next exhibit along the trail and has two bald eagles   This  area opened in 2004.

Cascade Stream and Pond is the oldest of the Great Northwest exhibits, having opened in 1982. It features North American beavers, North American river otters, painted turtles and ducks including buffleheads, cinnamon teals, hooded mergansers, northern pintails, northern shovelers, redheads and wood ducks.

Cougar Crossing features two cougars, Chinook and Paiute, in a  facility that opened in 2006.

Next to Cougar Crossing is Condors of the Columbia. Three California condors, Kaweah, Tyrion and "432" (unnamed), moved into this new exhibit on May 24, 2014. These condors came from a large breeding facility located near Estacada, Oregon.

The last area along the Cascade Canyon Trail is the Trillium Creek Family Farm. Opened in 2004 at a cost of $1 million, animals are presented by high school students who also explain local farming historical trends, technology, and demonstrate related activities such as composting, shearing, and agriculture. A variety of domestic animals such as pygmy and Pygora goats and chickens are part of the farm's exhibits.

The final area of the Great Northwest Exhibit is the Steller Cove which features animals and plants from the Oregon Coast. The $11 million exhibit opened in 2000 and includes a tide pool and kelp forest populated with harbor seals and sea otters.

Nature Exploration Station
The Nature Exploration Station is part of the zoo's education complex that opened in 2017. It includes interactive educational exhibits, an insect zoo with living insects and other arthropods, being raised for release into the wild. Some of the species include Australian walking sticks, emperor scorpions, giant African millipedes, Madagascar hissing cockroaches and Mexican redknee tarantulas. {</ref>

Penguinarium

The zoo has a Penguinarium which exhibits Humboldt penguins, Originally built in 1959, it was extensively remodeled in 1982 to represent the Peruvian coast, and remodeled again in 2011 to improve water efficiency.

Polar Passage
Opened in 2021, Polar Passage features polar bears in an exhibit modeled on the Arctic tundra and coast that includes naturalistic landscaping, tundra plants, elevated areas for long views, shallow and deep saltwater pools, and areas to accommodate family groups.

Primate Forest
The Primate Forest contains Red Ape Reserve, a 2010 indoor/outdoor exhibit housing Bornean andSumatran orangutans and northern white-cheeked gibbons, and a chimpanzee indoor/outdoor habitat that opened in 2021.

The zoo housed the world's oldest Sumatran orangutan, Inji, who celebrated her 59th birthday on January 30, 2019. Inji was humanely euthanized January 9, 2021 after keepers noticed her failing health.

Behind the scenes animals
The zoo also houses some behind the scenes animals such as Blue and Gold macaws, rabbits, Toucans, reptiles, a kinkajou, a prehensile-tailed porcupine, and a two toed sloth.

Other attractions
 Wildlife Live! summer shows, weather permitting
 Summer concert series
 Zoolights: December holiday evenings light display
 Washington Park and Zoo Railway
 Carousel

Conservation

The Oregon Zoo collaborates with wildlife agencies and conservation organizations on recovery projects for imperiled species including California condors, western pond turtles, northern leopard frogs, Oregon silverspot butterflies and Taylor’s checkerspot butterflies. Through its Future for Wildlife grants program, the zoo funds projects that directly contribute to the survival, health and welfare of free-living populations and ecosystems in the Pacific Northwest. The zoo manages a community science project to monitor the American pika and was the first zoo in the world to successfully breed critically endangered Columbia Basin pygmy rabbits and Oregon silverspot butterflies.

The zoo's Integrated Conservation Action Plan (ICAP) centers on four regions: Pacific Northwest, Arctic, Southeast Asia and West Africa. In 2012 the Oregon Zoo became the first zoo to draw blood samples from polar bears without the use of anesthesia, leading to the development of a groundbreaking polar bear conservation science program. The zoo has since partnered with the U.S. Geological Survey on polar bear diet, energetics, and movement studies. In Borneo, the zoo supports elephant conservation by funding two ranger positions, and partners with Malaysian and Indonesian organizations to mitigate human-wildlife conflict and improve animal welfare for elephants and orangutans.

California Condors 
In 2001 the zoo joined the U.S. Fish and Wildlife Service’s California Condor Recovery Program. California Condors are slow to reproduce, laying only one egg every one to two years.  In 2003 the first six condor breeding pairs were brought to the zoo's 52-acre Johnsson Center for Wildlife Conservation. As of 2019, 79 chicks have hatched, 56 Oregon Zoo-reared birds have gone out to field pens for release, and over 50 have been released into the wild.

The zoo also manages community-based conservation education efforts, including the Non-Lead Hunting Education Program, to protect condors and other wildlife from lead poisoning, the greatest cause of wild condor mortality. Ingesting carcasses riddled with toxic lead fragments results in approximately 50 percent of known causes of condor deaths since 1992.

Pacific Northwest Frogs and Turtles 
From 1998 to 2012 the zoo partnered on a recovery effort for endangered Oregon spotted frogs, a candidate for listing under the federal Endangered Species Act, and currently collaborates on a head-start and release program for northern leopard frogs.  Frog eggs are collected and hatched at the Oregon Zoo or the Cedar Creek Correction Center, which has partnered with the zoo since 2009. Juvenile frogs are then released into the wild, with a goal of creating a self-sustaining population. The captive rearing project works in collaboration with regional zoos and aquariums to save Pacific Northwest frog species imperiled by loss of habitat, invasive predators and the deadly chytrid fungus, which has quickly spread from Africa to threaten amphibian populations worldwide.

The Oregon Zoo's Western Pond Turtle Recovery Project has helped establish two new western pond turtle populations in the Columbia River Gorge, where invasive bullfrogs have driven the tiny species to the brink of extinction.  Infant pond turtles are collected and raised in the project lab at the zoo until they large enough to be safely released back into the wild. More than 1,500 turtles have been released in the Columbia Gorge since 1990, with a 95 percent annual survival rate.

Butterflies 
In 1999, at the request of the US Fish and Wildlife Service, the Oregon Zoo joined with Seattle's Woodland Park Zoo in a silverspot butterfly captive rearing program to save a species once found from California to British Columbia and now reduced to five isolated populations. Around 2,000 butterflies have been raised from larvae and released each year at the Oregon coast. For this work the two zoos were jointly awarded the 2012 AZA North American Conservation Award. In 2019, the Oregon Zoo successfully bred a captive silverspot butterfly for the first time in the world, producing in 269 viable offspring.

Additionally, the zoo has partnered with the Coffee Creek Correctional Facility to train inmates who volunteer to help raise and care for the critically endangered Taylor's butterfly. Habitat degradation due to invasive species, urban development and agriculture have reduced the Taylor's checkerspots' native habitat by 99 percent. The Taylor's checkerspot captive rearing project has raised and released over 28,000 butterflies.

Borneo Elephants 
Oregon Zoo’s Care and Conservation of Borneo Elephants program supports projects in Sabah, Malaysia, to reduce human-wildlife conflict, create safe travel corridors for elephants and other wildlife in degraded landscapes and provide care for injured or orphaned elephants. The Zoo partners with Seratu Aatai to promote co-existence between people and elephants through research and educational outreach to local communities, government agencies, the palm oil industry and academics.

In 2015 the Woodland Park Zoo, Houston Zoo, Oregon Zoo and HUTAN-KOCP founded the “Borneo Elephant Zoo Alliance” with the goal of ensuring long-term survival of the Bornean elephant in the wild. The alliance focuses on enhancing scientific knowledge of elephant ecology and conservation status and reducing human-animal conflict in the Kinabatangan River area through community outreach, public policy, and use of technology.  In recent years, Oregon Zoo’s work with HUTAN-KOCP has focused primarily on forest preservation and reforestation for the benefit of both elephants and orangutans.

Intertwined with these efforts is managing the impact of palm oil production. The Oregon Zoo is a member of the Round Table on Sustainable Palm Oil (RSPO), which has developed and is implementing global environmental and social standards for sustainable palm oil. As a member, the Oregon Zoo has committed to using only RSPO certified palm oil.

Incidents and controversies

The birth of Packy in 1962 began an elephant breeding program at the Oregon Zoo, resulting in a total of 28 elephant calves being born to date, of which seven were sired by Packy. Of these, however, 15 died prematurely and the whereabouts of two calves are unknown. Some elephants such as Stoney, Sabu, and Prince were sold to the circus, a few elephants such as Hanako and Dino were loaned to other zoos, whereas Emma and Teak were sold to private buyers.

On July 4, 1970, three intoxicated men broke into the zoo at night. One of them was killed by the zoo's two lions while he was showing off by lowering himself into their enclosure. The next night, one of the men broke into the zoo again and shot both of the lions. The incident stirred a public outcry against the men, including the victim of the mauling and sparked a wave of donations to replace the lions.

In April 2000, Rose-Tu, a female elephant born at the zoo, was severely abused by her handler, resulting in 176 lacerations including puncture wounds allegedly due to the handler attempting to shove a bullhook into her anus. It was speculated that the trauma suffered by her as a result of this experience may have compromised her ability to raise calves. The handler was dismissed by the zoo and sentenced to two years probation and 120 hours of community service, the most severe punishment allowed by state laws at the time. As fallout from this incident, Animal Legal Defense Fund authored the Rose-Tu law, signed by Governor John Kitzhaber in 2001. The law made Oregon the first U.S. state to legally recognize the link between animal abuse and violence toward people, and increased the penalties for animal abuse.

In December 2012, the Seattle Times brought to light that the new-born elephant Lily, sired by Tusko, a bull elephant on loan from the elephant rental company Have Trunk Will Travel, was contracted to be owned by the private company. After widespread public outcry, the zoo raised funds to acquire both Tusko and Lily from Have Trunk Will Travel for $400,000 in February 2013.

In May 2014, then-director Kim Smith and lead veterinarian Dr. Mitch Finnegan were dismissed by Metro, the agency governing the Zoo, over alleged lapses in protocols following the death of Kutai, a 20-year-old orangutan, during surgery. After the Zoo protested the veterinarian's termination at Metro Council, he was rehired in July.

In June 2014, six tamarin monkeys died two days after arriving at the zoo from Harvard's New England Primate Research Center. The incident, along with previous primate deaths in Massachusetts, prompted a USDA investigation of the Harvard center that had transported the monkeys.

The animal welfare organization In Defense of Animals has rated Oregon Zoo on their Ten Worst Zoos for Elephants list for seven years. The animal rights group "Free the Oregon Zoo Elephants" has been campaigning to end the zoo's captive breeding program and release the elephants to a sanctuary. The organization and their goals have been met with support from activists and celebrities such as Bob Barker and Lilly Tomlin, but has been criticized by experts such as Dr. Senthilvel K.S.S. Nathan, from Malaysia's Sabah Wildlife Department, particularly in response to the call for removal of the zoo's critically endangered Borneo elephant, Chendra. Dr. Nathan was recently dismissed from his position for sexual and financial misconduct.

Public access
Parking at the Oregon Zoo costs $2 per hour, to a maximum of $8 per day. 
The Washington Park light rail station provides regional public transit access to the Oregon Zoo. Additionally, TriMet bus route 63-Washington Park, which runs seven days a week year-round, serves the zoo via Washington Park.

See also
The Continuity of Life Forms, a mosaic by Portland architect and artist Willard Martin that was originally installed at the former entrance to the zoo in 1959, and was re-installed outside of the zoo's new education center in July 2016.
 Charles Frederic Swigert Jr. Memorial Fountain, also installed at the Oregon Zoo

References

External links

 
1888 establishments in Oregon
Metro (Oregon regional government)
Music venues in Portland, Oregon
Parks in Portland, Oregon
Tourist attractions in Portland, Oregon
Washington Park (Portland, Oregon)
Zoos established in 1888
Zoos in Oregon